Saint Louis School, located in the neighborhood of Kaimuki in Honolulu, Hawaii, is a historic Roman Catholic college preparatory school for boys. It was founded in 1846 to serve Catholics in the former Kingdom of Hawaii.  Located within the Roman Catholic Diocese of Honolulu, it is affiliated with the Society of Mary, a religious order of brothers and priests called the Marianists who also administer Chaminade University of Honolulu, formerly the college section of Saint Louis School. It is located near Sacred Hearts Academy, a girls' school founded by the Congregation of the Sacred Hearts of Jesus and Mary, and both schools hold joint programs such as cultural festivals and the JROTC.

History

Establishment

Saint Louis School was originally located in the Āhuimanu area of windward Oahu as the College of Āhuimanu, founded in 1846 by the Fathers of the Congregation of the Sacred Hearts of Jesus and Mary. In 1881, the school was relocated to Beretania Street, in downtown Honolulu, adjacent to Washington Place, the home of Liliuokalani, who was Queen of Hawaii from 1891 to 1893. When the school moved to downtown Honolulu, it was called the College of Saint Louis, named after the patron saint of Louis Maigret, Bishop of Honolulu. In 1883, the school moved again for a third time to Kamakela (known today as College Walk), on the bank of the Nuʻuanu Stream, near Chinatown, Honolulu.  This remained the campus until the 1920s.

The high school and college sections eventually split up and the emblem for Saint Louis College can be seen above the door of the administration building of Chaminade University on the Chaminade/Saint Louis campus. Marianists assumed control of the school and determined a need to expand facilities to serve the burgeoning Hawaiian Catholic population, who included many Filipino immigrants.  Because of the Marianist core mission to educate regardless of ethnic, religious, or fiscal means, the Order purchased land in Kalaepōhaku, a hillside division of Honolulu's Kaimuki community, to enable the school to better serve Hawaii.  Kalaepōhaku opened in September 1928 as Saint Louis School.

Developments

In the years following World War II, Saint Louis School re-evaluated its mission. Beginning in 1949, it dropped the lower grade levels one at a time, concentrating on a curriculum as a high school serving grades 9 through 12.

In 1980, it reinstated grades 7 and 8. In 1990, grade 6 was reinstated. The school created a middle school consisting of grades 6 through 8, operating independently within Saint Louis School. Grade 5 was reinstated and added to the middle school. In 2015 Saint Louis School announced its plans to expand again to become a K-12 school for the 2016–17 school year. The school currently provides for students from grades K-12.

Academics

Saint Louis School is fully accredited by the Western Catholic Education Association (WCEA) and the Western Association of Schools and Colleges (WASC).  It offers three distinct curricula.

 An accelerated college preparatory program for students planning to attend very selective colleges or universities.
 A college preparatory program.
 A general program for students planning to attend trade or business schools, two-year community colleges, or enter the military or work force.

Athletics

Saint Louis School plays competitively in the Interscholastic League of Honolulu (ILH) and the Hawai'i High School Athletic Association (HHSAA).  Sometimes it fields members in the Pac-5, an alliance of Honolulu-area private academies.

As the state has no professional sports teams, high school teams in Hawaii are extremely popular with the public.  Several generations of Hawaiian residents have become avid fans of Saint Louis School athletics, especially its football team.  The Honolulu Advertiser and Honolulu Star-Bulletin newspapers have nicknamed Saint Louis School's team as Hawaii's Team; it has played in invitational tournaments throughout the world.

Saint Louis School also fields teams in bowling, cross country, kayaking, tennis, and water polo in the fall. In winter it competes in canoe paddling, basketball, soccer, swimming and diving, riflery, tennis and wrestling. In spring it competes in baseball, golf, judo, tennis, track, and volleyball.

Saint Louis has had a strong history in Football winning a total of fourteen Oahu State Prep Bowls, in 1983 and consecutively from 1986 to 1998. Continuing from 1998 Saint Louis went on to win the HHSAA Football Championship in 1999, 2002, 2010, 2016, 2017, 2018, and most recently in 2019.

Saint Louis also won Hawaii state basketball championships in 1968 and 1986 with Kaipo Johnston Spencer first as a player in ‘68 then later  as coach of the ‘86 team.

Notable alumni
Government

 Sun Fo (1911), high-ranking official in the government of the Republic of China. Premier of the Republic of China from 26 November 1948 to 12 March 1949.

John A. Burns (1930), Governor of the State of Hawaii, he served as the second governor of Hawaii from 1962 to 1974.
Peter Tali Coleman (1939), Governor of American Samoa.
Calvin Say (1970), a member of the Hawaii House of Representatives from 1976–2021, Speaker Emeritus of the Hawaii House of Representatives.
John C. Lane (1890), Mayor of Honolulu from 1915 to 1917.
Neal S. Blaisdell (1921), Mayor of Honolulu from 1955 to 1969

Athletics
Ted Makalena, American professional golfer.
Benny Agbayani (1989), a former professional baseball player for the New York Mets, the Colorado Rockies and the Boston Red Sox.
Chad Santos (1999), MLB player for the San Francisco Giants.
Brandon League (2001), MLB player for the Toronto Blue Jays, Seattle Mariners, and Los Angeles Dodgers. 2011 MLB All-star.
Rico Garcia (2012), MLB pitcher for the Colorado Rockies.
Jordan Yamamoto (2014), pitcher for the Miami Marlins and New York Mets.
Herman Wedemeyer (1943)
Reggie Ho (1984), placekicker for Notre Dame; currently a cardiologist.
Vili Maumau (1993), former defensive tackle for the University of Colorado and the Carolina Panthers.
Olin Kreutz (1995), former NFL player for the Chicago Bears and the New Orleans Saints. 4-time NFL All-Pro selection, 6-time Pro Bowl selection, and member of the NFL 2000s All-Decade Team.
Chris Fuamatu-Ma'afala (1995), former NFL running back for the Pittsburgh Steelers and the Jacksonville Jaguars.
Dominic Raiola (1996), NFL player for the Detroit Lions. 2000 All-American center and Rimington Trophy winner at University of Nebraska.
Jason Gesser (1998), former collegiate quarterback for the Washington State Cougars. 2002 Pac-10 Co-Offensive Player of The Year with Carson Palmer.
Timmy Chang (2000), former collegiate quarterback for the University of Hawaii Warriors. Ranked 2nd all-time in NCAA career passing yards with 17,072.
Tyson Alualu (2005), a professional football player for the Pittsburgh Steelers.
Cameron Higgins (2005), quarterback for Weber State University.
Jeremiah Masoli (2006), quarterback for the University of Oregon Ducks and Ole Miss Rebels. 2008 Holiday Bowl MVP. Quarterback for the Hamilton Tiger-Cats of the Canadian Football League.
Marcus Mariota (2011), a quarterback for the Atlanta Falcons. 3-time Pac-12 All-Conference 1st Team (2012, 2013, 2014). 2013 Fiesta Bowl MVP, 2013 Alamo Bowl MVP, 2014 Heisman Winner, and 2015 Rose Bowl MVP. Second overall pick, taken by the Tennessee Titans in 2015.
Ka'ai Tom (2012), MLB outfielder for the San Francisco Giants
Kamalei Correa (2012), former Linebacker for Boise State and current Linebacker for the Jacksonville Jaguars. Drafted in the 2nd round of the 2016 NFL Draft to the Baltimore Ravens.
Tua Tagovailoa (2016), quarterback for the Miami Dolphins. Drafted 5th overall in the 2020 NFL Draft.
Craig Stutzmann, former assistant football coach for Washington State University

Other
Dean Pitchford (1968), songwriter, screenwriter, director, actor, and novelist. Oscar, Golden Globe, and Grammy Award winner for "Fame". He also was the screenwriter for the motion picture, "Footloose."
Joseph Caravalho, US Army physician and current Deputy Surgeon General and Deputy Commanding General (Support), United States Army Medical Command.
George Helm (1968), a Hawaiian Community leader, co-founder of Protect Kahoolawe Ohana.
Walter A. Dods, Jr. (1959), a Hawaii Bank Executive

Notes and references

External links
 Saint Louis School
 Society of Mary Province of the United States

Roman Catholic Diocese of Honolulu
Catholic secondary schools in Hawaii
Educational institutions established in 1846
Boys' schools in the United States
Private K-12 schools in Honolulu
Marianist schools
1846 establishments in Hawaii